Ragsdale is an unincorporated community and census-designated place in Washington Township, Knox County, Indiana. As of the 2010 census it had a population of 129.

Geography

Demographics

References

Census-designated places in Knox County, Indiana
Census-designated places in Indiana